Noureddine Boughanmi (born 3 November 1960) is a Tunisian boxer. He competed in the men's featherweight event at the 1984 Summer Olympics.

References

1960 births
Living people
Tunisian male boxers
Olympic boxers of Tunisia
Boxers at the 1984 Summer Olympics
Place of birth missing (living people)
Mediterranean Games gold medalists for Tunisia
Mediterranean Games medalists in boxing
Competitors at the 1983 Mediterranean Games
Featherweight boxers
20th-century Tunisian people
21st-century Tunisian people